Tang-e Khoshk may refer to:
 Tang-e Khoshk, Isfahan
 Tang-e Khoshk, Khuzestan
 Tang-e Khoshk, Kohgiluyeh and Boyer-Ahmad